Witrogoszcz-Osada  is a settlement in the administrative district of Gmina Łobżenica, within Piła County, Greater Poland Voivodeship, in west-central Poland.

References

Witrogoszcz-Osada